The Kariega River is situated in the Eastern Cape province of South Africa. This river, which starts 24 km west of Grahamstown, is characterized by its intermittent flow and empties into the ocean through an estuary. The Kariega River is also the source of the name for the nearby Kariega Park.

Origin of the name 

The cave paintings found near the river showcase a variety of creatures, including the Steenbok, and objects such as the Swartberg sailing ship. These paintings also highlight the fact that animals were sometimes depicted in caves that were not their natural habitats, like the Swartberg ship, which was located 100 km from the sea.

The Khoikhoi were the first settlers in much of the Cape region. Although their descendants still live in the area, their language is only spoken in some parts of the Northern Cape. However, many Khoikhoi words are still in use in the country today, particularly in the form of place names, like Knysna, meaning "ferns," a town along the Garden Route, Cango Caves (Cango meaning "wet mountain"), and Kariega Park, located near the Kariega River.

The exact meaning and origin of the name Kariega River is uncertain, but it has ties to the early settlers in the area and is the name of one of the Cape's most attractive and graceful small bucks. Despite not being the natural habitat of the Steenbok, the name is representative of the Cape region and its history.

Other Kariega Rivers 
In the Eastern Cape, there are three more Kariega Rivers.

The Kariega and the Beervlei Dam

The Kariega River drains into the Beervlei Dam north of Willowmore. The name of this river has occurred in a number of forms, including Karuiga and Karuka and this has led the experts to assume that in this case, the Kariega should, in fact, be one of these older forms and that it alludes to 'buffalo'. After all, the river was known as the Buffels – Buffalo - by the area's first European residents. However, several sources claim that the name means 'Steenbok,' based not on linguistics but on the presence of the antelope in the area.

The Kariega and the Sundays River

The Kariega River, a tributary of the Sundays River, is another option. For much of its course, it runs across the Steenbok Flats, where there is a farm called Kariega. Steenbok were common in this area and are still seen there now. As a result, and based on linguistic evidence, experts feel that Kariega does indeed refer to Steenbok in this situation.

The Kariega and the Great Fish River

The Kariega River, which has its source in the highlands 20 kilometres north of Somerset East, is also a tributary of the Great Fish River. There are no historical records of Steenbok in this location, but the river flows through terrain that is typical of that favoured by this little buck, thus there is no reason to doubt that Kariega also stands for 'Steenbok' in this case.

References

External links
Kariega Game Reserve

Rivers of the Eastern Cape